The Golden Reel Award for Outstanding Achievement in Sound Editing – Series 1 Hour – Effects / Foley is an annual award given by the Motion Picture Sound Editors. It honors sound editors whose work has warranted merit in the field of television; in this case, their work in the field of sound effects and foley work in long form broadcast media. It was first awarded in 2002, for episodes premiering the previous year, under the title Best Sound Editing in Television - Effects & Foley, Long Form. The term "long form" was added to the category in 2002, as long form television had been award under the category titled Best Sound Editing - Television Movie of the Week - Effects & Foley, or some moniker of it, since 1998. The award has been given with its current title since 2022. Also in 2022, limited and anthology series were separated from other hour-long programs and given their own category, Outstanding Achievement in Sound Editing – Limited Series or Anthology, though the categry was not presented the following year.

Winners and nominees

1990s

2000s

2010s

2020s

Programs with multiple nominations

3 nominations
 Battlestar Galactica (Sci Fi)
 Westworld (HBO)

2 nominations
 Black Mirror (Netflix)
 CSI: Crime Scene Investigation (CBS)
 Game of Thrones (HBO)
 Homeland (Showtime)
 Ozark (Netflix)
 Star Trek: Discovery (CBS All Access/Paramount+)
 True Detective (HBO)
 The Walking Dead (AMC)

References

Golden Reel Awards (Motion Picture Sound Editors)